is the terminus on the Kintetsu Railway Yoshino Line in Yoshino, Yoshino District, Nara Prefecture, Japan.

Lines 
 Kintetsu Railway
 Yoshino Line

Platforms and tracks

Connections
 Yoshino Omine Cable's Yoshino Ropeway for Yoshinoyama Station
 Yoshino Town Community Bus (Smile Bus)
 for Mount Yoshino

Surroundings
Yoshino Ropeway to Mount Yoshino (operated by Yoshino Ohmine Ke-buru Ropeway Bus Co.)
Kimpusen-ji
Chikurin-in
Yoshimizu Shrine
Tomb of Emperor Godaigo
Nyoirun-ji
Sakuramotobo

References

External links
 

Railway stations in Japan opened in 1928
Railway stations in Nara Prefecture